Dahlak may refer to:

Dahlak Archipelago, an island chain in the Red Sea
Dahlik language, a language spoken on three of those islands and in parts of Eritrea
Dahlak Subregion, part of Eritrea's Northern Red Sea region

See also
Dalek (disambiguation)